The balance of threat theory was proposed by Stephen M. Walt in his article Alliance Formation and the Balance of World Power, published in the journal International Security in 1985. It was later further elaborated in his book The Origins of Alliances (1987). The theory modified the popular balance of power theory in the neorealist school of international relations. 

According to the balance of threat theory, the alliance behavior of states is determined by the threat that they perceive from other states. Walt contends that states generally balance by allying against a perceived threat, but very weak states are more likely to bandwagon with the rising threat to protect their own national security. He points to the example of the alliance patterns of European states before and during World War I and World War II, when nations with a significantly-greater combined power allied against the recognized threat of German expansionism.

Walt identifies four criteria states use to evaluate the threat posed by another state: its aggregate strength or power (size, population, latent power, and economic capabilities), its geographic proximity, its offensive capabilities, and its offensive or hostile intentions.

Walt argues that the more that other states view an emerging power as possessing those qualities, the more likely they are to view it as a threat and balance against it.

The balance of threat theory modified realism (as well as the neorealism of Kenneth Waltz) by separating power from threat. In the balance of power theory, which had previously dominated realist analyses, states balance against others whose power (military capabilities) was rising. Greater power was assumed to reflect offensive intentions. Walt argues that not to be borne out by empirical evidence and that the balance of threat theory, in which states will not balance against those that are rising in power but do not display offensive intentions, gives a better account of the evidence. For instance, the United States was more powerful than the other superpower, the Soviet Union, during the Cold War, but contrary to the balance of power theory, more states (members of NATO) allied with it than with the Soviet Union because the United States displayed intentions that were much less aggressive toward them than those displayed by the Soviet Union.

The flaw of the balance of power theory became even more striking after the disappearance of the Soviet threat. With its power unbalanced, Walt argued in 2004 that the United States is still formally allied with NATO, Japan, South Korea, and several other countries, and he hints that the U.S. might withdraw its forces, which still tend to provoke requests for a continued U.S. presence. Counterbalancing coalitions predicted by the balance of power theory hardly appeared:

See also
 Balance of power (international relations)
 Balance of terror
 Balancing (international relations)
 Bandwagoning
 Peace through strength

References

Scientific articles using the balance of threat theory
 Balance of Threat perception. And the prospects of NATO Mediterranean Dialogue; Alaa A. H. Abd Alazi; NATO; 2003
 Power vs. threat: Explanations of US balancing against the Soviet Union after 1976; Carmel Davis, University of Pennsylvania; 2004 
 “If you compress the spring, it will snap back hard”: The Ukrainian crisis and the balance of threat theory; Andreas M. Bock, Ingo Henneberg, Friedrich Plank; International Journal; 2014
 Why balancing fails. Theoretical reflections on Stephen M. Walt's 'Balance of Threat' theory; Andreas M. Bock, Ingo Henneberg; University of Cologne; 2013

Political realism
International relations